The Paris Motor Show is a biennial auto show in Paris.  Held during October, it is one of the most important auto shows, often with many new production automobile and concept car debuts. The show presently takes place in Paris expo Porte de Versailles. The Mondial is scheduled by the Organisation Internationale des Constructeurs d'Automobiles, which considers it a major international auto show.

In 2016, the Paris Motor Show welcomed 1,253,513 visitors, making it the most visited auto show in the world, ahead of Tokyo and Frankfurt.

The key figures of the show are:  of exhibition, 8 pavilions, 260 brands from 18 countries, 65 world premieres, more than 10 000 test drives for electric and hybrid cars, more than 10 000 journalists from 103 countries. Until 1986, it was called the Salon de l'Automobile; it took the name Mondial de l'Automobile in 1988 and Mondial Paris Motor Show in 2018.

The show was held annually until 1976; since which time, it has been held biennially.

History
The show was the first motor show in the world, started in 1898 by industry pioneer, Jules-Albert de Dion. After 1910, it was held at the Grand Palais in the Champs-Élysées. During the First World War motor shows were suspended, meaning that the show of October 1919 was only the 15th "Salon".

There was again no Paris Motor Show in 1925, the venue having been booked instead for an Exhibition of Decorative Arts. In October 1926, the Motor Show returned, this being the 26th Paris Salon de l'Automobile. The outbreak of war again intervened in 1939 when the 33rd Salon de l'Automobile was cancelled at short notice.

Normality of a sorts returned some six years later and the 33rd "Salon" finally opened in October 1946. In January 1977, it was announced that no Paris Motor Show would take place that year, because of the "current economic situation": at the same time the organisers confirmed that a 1978 Auto Salon for Paris was planned.

The 65th Salon de Paris duly opened on 15 October 1978 in the modern buildings of the Parc des Expositions, on the south western edge of central Paris at the Porte de Versailles, where the show had been held since 1962.

Editions
 1898 1st
 1913 14th "Salon de l'Automobile"
 1919 15th "Salon de l'Automobile" (Model Year 1920) The first "Salon" since 1913.
9 October 1919
65 French automobile makers exhibited (plus 22 French commercial vehicle manufacturers and 31 non-French automobile industry businesses). At least 118 exhibitors in total. 
There was no "Salon de l'Automobile" in 1920
 1921 16th "Salon de l'Automobile" (Model Year 1922)
 1922 17th "Salon de l'Automobile" (Model Year 1923)
4 October 1922
81 French automobile makers exhibited (plus one French commercial vehicle manufacturer, 7 "Coachbuilders" and 25 non-French automobile industry businesses.) 113 exhibitors in total.
 1923 18th "Salon de l'Automobile" (Model Year 1924)
 1924 19th "Salon de l'Automobile" (Model Year 1925)
2 October 1924
78 French automobile makers exhibited (plus four French commercial vehicle manufacturers and 34 non-French automobile industry businesses.) 116 exhibitors in total. 
There was no "Salon de l'Automobile" in 1925 due to the venue having been allocated to an Exhibition of Decorative Arts
 1926 20th "Salon de l'Automobile" (Model Year 1927) 
7 October 1926
81 French automobile makers exhibited and 42 non-French automobile industry businesses exhibited. 126 exhibitors in total
 1927 21st "Salon de l'Automobile" (Model Year 1928)
 1928 22nd "Salon de l'Automobile" (Model Year 1929)
 1929 23rd "Salon de l'Automobile" (Model Year 1930)
 1930 24th "Salon de l'Automobile" (Model Year 1931)  
2 October 1930
46 French automobile makers and 46 non-French automobile makers exhibited.  92 exhibitors in total.
 1931 25th "Salon de l'Automobile" (Model Year 1932)
1 October 1931
39 French automobile makers and 37 non-French automobile makers exhibited. 79 exhibitors in total.
 1932 26th "Salon de l'Automobile" (Model Year 1933)
 1933 27th "Salon de l'Automobile" (Model Year 1934)
5 October 1933
26 French automobile makers exhibited.
 1934 28th "Salon de l'Automobile" (Model Year 1935)

 1935 29th "Salon de l'Automobile" (Model Year 1936)
 1936 30th "Salon de l'Automobile" (Model Year 1937)
 1937 31st "Salon de l'Automobile" (Model Year 1938)
7 October 1937
22 French automobile makers exhibited.
 1938 32nd
 1946 33rd
 1947 34th "Salon de l'Automobile" (Model Year 1948)
23 October 1947
27 French automobile makers exhibited.
 1948 35th
 1949 36th
 1950 37th
 1951 38th "Salon de l'Automobile" (Model Year 1952)
4 October 1951
23 French automobile makers exhibited.
 1952 39th
 1953 40th
Inter Autoscooter world premiere
 1954 41st
Facel Vega world premiere
 1955 42nd
Citroën DS world premiere
Continental Mark II world premiere
 1956 43rd
Facel Vega Excellence world premiere
 1957 44th "Salon de l'Automobile" (Model Year 1958)
3 October 1957
24 French automobile makers exhibited.
 1958 45th
 1959 46th
Facel Vega Facellia
 1960 47th
Triumph Italia
 1961 48th "Salon de l'Automobile" (Model Year 1962)
5 October 1961
9 French automobile makers exhibited.  (Plus one "Jeep" maker and one coachbuilder)
 1962 49th Salon
This was the first year the show was held at the Porte de Versailles on the outskirts of Paris.
Buick Riviera world premiere
 1963 50th
 1964 51st
 1965 52nd "Salon de l'Automobile" (Model Year 1966)
October 1965
9 French automobile makers exhibited.  (Plus one "Jeep" maker and one coachbuilder)
 1966 53rd
 1967 54th "Salon de l'Automobile" (Model Year 1968)
6 October 1967
8 French automobile makers exhibited, plus one coachbuilder
Citroën Dyane world premiere
 1968 55th "Salon de l'Automobile" (Model Year 1969)
 1974 61st "Salon de l'Automobile" (Model Year 1975)
Citroën CX world premiere
 1976 63rd "Salon de l'Automobile" (Model Year 1977) known as a "Salon of Sobriété"
Ferrari 400 world premiere
 1978 64th "Salon de l'Automobile" (Model Year 1979)
15 October 1978
 1988 73rd edition
 1992 75th edition
Introduction of the Renault Twingo
 1998 Paris Motor Show
 2000 Paris Motor Show
 2002 Paris Motor Show
 2004 Paris Motor Show
 2006 Paris Motor Show
 2008 Paris Motor Show
 2010 Paris Motor Show
 2012 Paris Motor Show
 2014 Paris Motor Show
 2016 Paris Motor Show

 2018 Paris Motor Show
There was no "Salon de l'Automobile" in 2020 due to the COVID-19 pandemic
 2022 Paris Motor Show

References

External links

 
Official website   

1898 establishments in France
Recurring events established in 1898
 
Automotive industry in France
Economy of Paris
Autumn events in France